The Gangetic scissortail rasbora  (Rasbora rasbora) is a species of ray-finned fish in the genus Rasbora.

References 

Rasboras
Fish of Bangladesh
Fish of Thailand
Fish described in 1822
Taxa named by Francis Buchanan-Hamilton